Hamamak (also Romanized as Ḩamāmak) is a village in Hesar-e Amir Rural District, in the Central District of Pakdasht County, Tehran Province, Iran. At the 2006 census, its population was 970, in 248 families.

References 

Populated places in Pakdasht County